The School of Art, Bournville (formerly Bournville College of Art and Bournville Centre for Visual Arts but better known as Bournville School of Art) was an art school in Birmingham, England. It was located at Ruskin Hall on Linden Road in the area of Bournville. It became part of Birmingham Institute of Art and Design (BIAD) at Birmingham City University when it merged with the university in 1988 when the latter was still Birmingham Polytechnic.

The school was refurbished for £6 million in 2002 and reopened on 21 October 2002, precisely 100 years after the foundation stone for Ruskin Hall was laid. It is home to the International Project Space, and is the site of Birmingham's annual Creative Partnerships exhibition, a showcase of contemporary and visual art produced by local school students. The centre was the subject of controversy in 2008 regarding an exhibition honouring the work of author J. G. Ballard, which included sexually explicit images (described as "heavily pornographic" by a local councillor) and the wreckage of a car.

Alumni of the school include photographer Richard Billingham, artists Roger Hiorns and Donald Rodney, illustrator John Shelley, video artist Marty St. James, and actress Marjorie Yates.

From 2013, the School's courses moved to Birmingham City University's new Parkside Building in Birmingham city centre, with the Bournville site becoming home to the University's International College.

See also
Arts in Birmingham
Education in Birmingham

References

External links
 BIAD Website

Art schools in England
Birmingham City University
Education in Birmingham, West Midlands
Educational institutions with year of establishment missing